Louis Charles Tsioropoulos (Greek: Λουδοβίκος Τσιωρόπουλος; 31 August 1930 – 22 August 2015) was a Greek-American professional basketball player who played for the National Basketball Association's Boston Celtics for three seasons from 1956–1959. He was born in Lynn, Massachusetts.

College career

Tsioropoulos played college basketball at the University of Kentucky under legendary coach Adolph Rupp. As a sophomore in 1951, he was a member of Kentucky's NCAA Championship team, which defeated Kansas State 68-58 in the Championship game.

In the fall of 1952, a point shaving scandal involving three Kentucky players (a fourth player, Bill Spivey, a teammate of Tsioropoulos on the 1951 National Championship team, was alleged to have been involved in the scandal but denied the charge) over a four-year period forced Kentucky to forfeit its upcoming season, which would have been the senior year for Tsiroropoulos and future Hall-of-Famers Frank Ramsey and Cliff Hagan. The suspension of the season made Kentucky's basketball team, in effect, the first college sports team to get the "death penalty", which actually was nothing more than the NCAA asking members schools not to schedule Kentucky, and not mandating it.

Tsioropoulos, Ramsey and Hagan all graduated from Kentucky in 1953, and as a result, became eligible for the NBA draft. All three players were selected by the Boston Celtics: Ramsey in the first round, Hagan in the third, and Tsioropoulos in the seventh. All three also returned to Kentucky for one more season, despite graduating. After finishing the regular season (one in which Tsioropoulos averaged 14.5 points per game) with a perfect 25-0 record and a #1 ranking in the Associated Press, Kentucky had been offered a bid into the NCAA Tournament. However, then-existing NCAA rules prohibited graduate students from participating in post-season play. The Wildcats declined the bid because their participation would have forced them to play without Tsioropoulos, Ramsey and Hagan, thus jeopardizing their perfect season.

Tsioropoulos' #16 jersey was retired by his alma mater, and he is in the University of Kentucky Athletics Hall of Fame.

Professional career

Boston Celtics (1956-1959) 
Tsioropoulos spent some time in the Air Force before joining the Celtics in 1956.

As Tom Heinsohn's backup at small forward, Tsioropoulos played three seasons with the Celtics, winning NBA championships in 1957 and 1959. In 157 NBA games, he averaged 5.8 points per game. His best NBA season was 1957–58; in which he averaged 7.7 points per game. This season was the only one of his three NBA seasons in which he played in the playoffs; he averaged 6.3 points per game. That year, the Bob Pettit-led St. Louis Hawks (which also featured Tsioropoulos' ex-college teammate Hagan, who had been traded to the Hawks in the Bill Russell deal) defeated the Celtics in the NBA Finals.

Post basketball career
Tsioropoulos was a principal of Jefferson County High School, and later lived in Florida. He died in Louisville on 22 August 2015 at the age of 84.

References

External links

nba.com historical playerfile
Lou Tsioropoulos profile @ celtic-nation.com

1930 births
2015 deaths
American men's basketball players
American people of Greek descent
Basketball players from Massachusetts
Boston Celtics draft picks
Boston Celtics players
Kentucky Wildcats men's basketball players
Small forwards
Sportspeople from Lynn, Massachusetts